The 1899 College Football All-Southern Team consists of American football players selected to the College Football All-Southern Teams selected by various organizations in 1899. The "Iron Men" of Sewanee won the SIAA championship. The Vanderbilt Hustler remarked on Suter's selection of 9 of his own players, "Only nine! He surely must have been thinking of a baseball team."

All-Southerns of 1899

Ends
Bart Sims, Sewanee (O, HMS-s)
Herman Koehler, North Carolina (O)
Walter Schreiner, Texas (HMS)
Walter Simmons, Vanderbilt (HMS)
John F. H. Barbee, Vanderbilt (HMS-s)

Tackles
W. Hamilton†, Georgia (O, HMS [as g])
John Loyd, Virginia (O)
Deacon Jones, Sewanee (HMS)
Richard Bolling, Sewanee (HMS)
Andrew Ritchie, Georgia (HMS-s)
James Hart, Texas (HMS-s)

Guards

William Choice, VPI (O)
Wild Bill Claiborne, Sewanee (HMS)
Wallace Crutchfield, Vanderbilt (O)
William H. Newman, Tennessee (HMS-s)

Centers
Carlos A. Long, Georgetown (O)
William Poole, Sewanee (HMS)
Edward Overshiner, Texas (HMS-s)

Quarterbacks
Warbler Wilson†, Sewanee (O, HMS)
Semp Russ, Texas (HMS-s)
Ed Huguley, Auburn (HMS-s)

Halfbacks

Arthur Feagin, Auburn (O, HMS-s)
Henry Seibels, Sewanee (College Football Hall of Fame) (HMS)
Harry Gerstle, Virginia (O)
Rex Kilpatrick, Sewanee (HMS)
Orvill Burke, Vanderbilt (HMS-s)
Lawrence Levert, Tulane (HMS-s)
Quintard Gray, Sewanee (HMS-s)
Franklin Bivings, Auburn (HMS-s)

Fullbacks
Ormond Simkins, Sewanee (HMS)
Robert M. Coleman, Virginia (O)
John H. McIntosh, Georgia (HMS-s)
Raymond Keller, Texas (HMS-s)
Charles L. Eshleman, Tulane (HMS-s)

Key
† = Unanimous selection

O = selected by W. A. Lambeth in Outing. 

HMS = selected by H. M. Suter, head coach at Sewanee: The University of the South.  It had substitutes, denoted by a small S.

References

College Football All-Southern Teams
All-Southern team